David Samuel Kestenbaum is an American radio producer for Planet Money and This American Life.  He was formerly a correspondent for National Public Radio. He generally covers science and economic issues.

Kestenbaum earned a Ph.D in physics from Harvard University in 1996 with a thesis entitled Observation of Top Quark Anti-Top Quark Production Using a Soft Lepton B Tag in Proton Anti-Proton Collisions at 1.8 TeV working under the supervision of Melissa Franklin. In 1997, Kestenbaum was selected as a AAAS Mass Media Fellow, working at a NPR affiliate radio station in Columbus, Ohio.

References

External links 
 David Kestenbaum at npr.org

Living people
American radio journalists
Harvard University alumni
NPR personalities
American reporters and correspondents
1969 births
American podcasters
American bloggers
21st-century American non-fiction writers